The Chess Players is an oil on canvas painting by Cornelis de Man, created c. 1670, now in the Museum of Fine Arts in Budapest, Hungary as Inventory Number 320. It entered the collection in 1871.

References

1670 paintings
Dutch Golden Age paintings
Paintings in the collection of the Museum of Fine Arts (Budapest)